The Pittsburgh water crisis arose from a substantial increase in the lead concentration of the city's water supply. Although catalyzed by the hiring of cost-cutting water consultancy Veolia in 2012, and an unauthorized change of anti-erosion chemicals in 2014, this spike in lead concentration has roots in decades of lead pipe erosion. Since the Pittsburgh Water and Sewer Authority (PWSA) first failed its water quality test in 2016, it has exceeded the federal lead threshold of 15 ppb by almost 1.5 times. This level of lead contamination poses serious health risks to residents, particularly children and pregnant women.  In an attempt to remedy the situation, the PWSA has begun removing lead pipes from the city's water lines and has decided to introduce orthophosphate to the water supply.

Lead contamination 
While the Pittsburgh water supply has suffered from a variety of contaminants, the most persistent contaminant has been lead from the aging lead piping infrastructure throughout the city.

Causes 
Pittsburgh's water lines include a significant number of lead pipes which have inevitably eroded to a certain degree within the past few decades. In 2014, the Pittsburgh Water and Sewer Authority (PWSA) broke state law by switching from soda ash to caustic soda as an anti-corrosion treatment without first receiving the necessary approval and permits from the Pennsylvania Department of Environmental Protection (DEP) as required by Pennsylvania. This unauthorized switch sparked an increase in erosion levels that made the water's lead levels spike beyond the federal limit of 15 ppb.

Risks 
Lead is a neurotoxin and of particular concern for children and pregnant women. In children, lead poisoning can contribute to developmental delays and learning disabilities as well as other varied symptoms including but not limited to irritability, weight loss, abdominal pain, and hearing loss. Newborns with lead poisoning are prone to premature death, lower birth weight, and delayed growth. If women get lead poisoning while pregnant, they are at a higher risk for miscarriage. With prolonged exposure, lead poisoning can lead to damage in the brain, kidneys, and nervous system in people of all ages, especially children. Although the federal lead threshold is 15 ppm, any concentration of lead in water is potentially dangerous to consumers. The Centers for Disease Control and Prevention (CDC) has a set reference level of 5 micrograms per deciliter (µg/dL) to identify children with elevated blood lead levels.

Public response 

About a quarter of PWSA customers receive their water supply through lead pipes, thus putting a significant portion of the Pittsburgh population at risk for lead consumption. Pittsburgh residents have complained about rising water prices alongside contaminated water.  Many unknowingly consumed lead-contaminated water, which can have long-term negative health effects. Since the solutions PWSA have proposed have yet to be fully implemented, some Pittsburgh residents have taken matters into their own hands by submitting personal water samples to laboratories for lead testing as well as installing filters into their water systems.

Connections to Flint, Michigan 
Flint, Michigan had a highly publicized and controversial lead crisis shortly before Pittsburgh.

Veolia 
Both the Flint and Pittsburgh lead crises were triggered by the misuse of chemicals to treat their water supplies.  In both cases, the private water company Veolia was involved. Flint hired Veolia in 2015 to help manage the lead crises, while Pittsburgh hired Veolia in 2012 before the lead crises emerged as a serious issue. However, in both cases, the cities complained of the lead problems worsening after hiring Veolia. Michigan attorney general Bill Schuette  filed a lawsuit against Veolia in 2016 for professional negligence. The Pittsburgh Water and Sewer Authority similarly tried to press charges, but Veolia struck back with claims that PWSA is responsible for the chemical change that sparked the Pittsburgh lead crises. Ultimately, the charges from both parties were dropped in Pittsburgh, and while the charges in Flint were not dropped, Veolia has not taken responsibility for the lead crisis, particularly since the decision to switch Flint's water source happened prior to the city's contract with Veolia.

Publicity 
In 2017, Virginia Tech professor Marc Edwards, who helped reveal the Flint lead crisis, pointed out that Pittsburgh's lead levels were higher than Flint's. Although the Pittsburgh lead crisis has been of comparable magnitude to Flint's, it has been significantly less publicized as officials have seemingly downplayed the issue.  Elected official Chelsa Wagner, controller of Allegheny County which includes Pittsburgh, criticized the Pittsburgh health department for failing to acknowledge the full extent of lead exposure in the area.

Solutions 
The Pittsburgh Water and Sewer Authority has proposed both a long term and short-term solution to alleviate the water supply's lead contamination.

Long term 
After a lead test revealed Pittsburgh's water supply was exceeding the federal limit in 2016, the PWSA was ordered to replace public lead service lines.  However, as the PWSA embarked on this task, an unexpected obstacle interfered with the progress of the lead pipe removal.  Since they were only required to replace public water lines, private lead lines were left behind.  This actually leaves the possibility of exacerbating the lead contamination since construction on the public lines physically disturbs the private lines, thus breaking up the lining within the pipes meant to prevent lead erosion.  Because of this risk, the practice of removing only public service lines was discontinued mid-2017.  A couple of months after the city ceased removing lead lines, legislation was passed that allowed the PWSA to use Pittsburgh's public safety powers to remove both public and private lines. The best, long-term solution is to remove all of the lead service lines in the city, but despite the legislation allowing for this to happen, it is still a lengthy and expensive endeavor that is unlikely to be fulfilled within the next ten years and could cost close to $400 million.

Short term 
While the pipe removal process is underway, the PWSA has decided to add orthophosphate to the water as a means of reducing lead corrosion. Since orthophosphates are attracted to the lining of metal pipes, they serve as a protective coating that prevents lead from leaching out of the pipes. In a study comparing orthophosphate to soda ash, the PWSA and Department of Environmental Protection (DEP) came to the conclusion that orthophosphate would be more effective as an anti-corrosive mechanism. In April 2019, the city began adding orthophosphate to the water supply. Two of four distribution points for orthophosphate are in the Highland Park neighborhood.

References

History of Pittsburgh
Lead poisoning incidents
Health in Pennsylvania
Water in Pennsylvania
Water resource management in the United States